The 48th Wisconsin Infantry Regiment was a volunteer infantry regiment that served in the Union Army during the American Civil War.

Service
The 48th Wisconsin was organized at Milwaukee, Wisconsin, and mustered into Federal service in February and March 1865. It was organized under the supervision of Lieutenant Colonel Henry B. Shears, Colonel Uri B. Pearsall being at the time in service as lieutenant colonel of a colored regiment.

The regiment was mustered out on March 24, 1866, at Fort Leavenworth, Kansas.

Casualties
The 48th Wisconsin suffered 16 enlisted men who died of disease, for a total of 16 fatalities.

Commanders
 Colonel Uri B. Pearsall

See also

 List of Wisconsin Civil War units
 Wisconsin in the American Civil War

References
The Civil War Archive

Military units and formations established in 1865
Military units and formations disestablished in 1866
Units and formations of the Union Army from Wisconsin
Military units and formations disestablished in 1865
1865 establishments in Wisconsin
1866 disestablishments in Wisconsin